Go Deuk-jong (1388–1452) was a scholar-official of the Joseon Dynasty Korea in the 14th century.

He was also diplomat and ambassador, representing Joseon interests in the tongsinsa (diplomatic mission) to the Ashikaga shogunate in Japan.

1439 mission to Japan
King Sejong dispatched a diplomatic mission to Japan in 1439.  This embassy to court of Ashikaga Yoshinori was led by Go Deuk-jong. Its purpose was to foster and maintain neighborly relations (Gyorin diplomacy); and assistance from the shogun was sought in suppressing the pirate raids from those known in Korean as waegu or in Japanese as the wakō.

The Japanese hosts may have construed this mission as tending to confirm a Japanocentric world order. Go Deuk-jong's actions were more narrowly focused in negotiating protocols for Joseon-Japan diplomatic relations.

See also
 Joseon diplomacy
 Joseon missions to Japan
 Joseon tongsinsa

References

Further reading

 Daehwan, Noh.  "The Eclectic Development of Neo-Confucianism and Statecraft from the 18th to the 19th Century," Korea Journal (Winter 2003).
 Kang, Etsuko Hae-jin . (1997). Diplomacy and Ideology in Japanese-Korean Relations: from the Fifteenth to the Eighteenth Century. Basingstoke, Hampshire; Macmillan. ;

External links
 Joseon Tongsinsa Cultural Exchange Association ; 

1388 births
1452 deaths
15th-century Korean people
Korean diplomats